Margaric acid, or heptadecanoic acid, is a saturated fatty acid. Classified as an odd-chain fatty acid, it occurs as a trace component of the fat and milkfat of ruminants. Salts and esters of margaric acid are called heptadecanoates.

Its name is derived from the Ancient Greek μάργαρος (márgar(on)), meaning "pearl(y)", due to its appearance.

Semiochemistry 
For many species, margaric acid plays a role as a semiochemical - specifically it possesses pheromonic and allomonic properties. Margaric acid has been identified in the subcaudal gland secretions of the European badger (Meles meles) and in the occipital gland secretions of male Bactrian camels (Camelus bactrianus) where it is one of the many pheromonic chemicals responsible for aiding in the finding and selection of mates.

Margaric acid is an attractant of the khapra beetle (Trogoderma granarium) and the yellow fever mosquito (Aedes aegypti) but is a repellent of the common house mosquito (Culex pipiens).

Margaric acid is also found in the precloacal gland secretions of many reptiles belonging to the order squamata, including the common leopard gecko (Eublepharis macularius) and the European viper (Vipera berus), where it is used for the identification of sexual partners.

Unsaturated forms 
Unsaturated derivatives of margaric acid are found in nature, although rarely.  Unsaturation occurs at position 9 or both at 9 and 12 positions of the fatty chain giving heptadecenoic (C17:1) and heptadecadienoic (C17:2) acids, respectively. C17:1 cis-9 (ω-8) is found at trace amounts in ruminant fats and some varieties of olive oils. Minor amounts (< 1%) of C17:1 cis-10 and C17:2 cis-8,11 were detected in seed oil of Portia tree (Thespesia populnea).

Rarity in vegetable and animal fats
Margaric acid is rare in animals and vegetables. In the 19th and early 20th centuries, however, the acid was often identified as a significant component of natural fats. Most likely, these were cases of misidentifying a eutectic mixture of  palmitic and stearic acids.

See also
 List of saturated fatty acids
 List of carboxylic acids
 Pentadecylic acid

References

External links
 

Fatty acids
Alkanoic acids
Semiochemicals